The Dollar is the debut studio album by American country music artist Jamey Johnson. Released in January 2006 on BNA Records, it features the single "The Dollar", which peaked at number 14 on the Billboard Hot Country Songs charts in early 2006. The second single, "Rebelicious", failed to chart, due to the merger of BMG and Sony Music Entertainment, and Johnson was dropped from BNA in mid-2006.

The track "She's All Lady" was also recorded by Joe Nichols on his 2007 album Real Things, while "Redneck Side of Me" was also recorded by Flynnville Train on their 2007 self-titled debut. The track "It Was Me" was also recorded by George Strait on his 2008 album Troubadour.

Track listing

Personnel
As listed in liner notes.
Wayd Battle - electric guitar
Jim "Moose" Brown - piano, B-3 organ, Wurlitzer
Pat Buchanan - electric guitar
J. T. Corenflos - electric guitar
Chad Cromwell - drums
Dan Dugmore - steel guitar, Dobro
Steve Gibson - electric guitar
Kevin "Swine" Grantt - bass guitar
Rob Hajacos - fiddle
Steve Hinson - steel guitar
Jamey Johnson - lead vocals
Kirk "Jelly Roll" Johnson - harmonica
George Jones - vocals on "Keepin' Up with the Jonesin'"
Randy McCormick - keyboards, piano, B-3 organ, Wurlitzer
Gary Prim - piano
Tom Roady - percussion
David Talbot - banjo
John Willis - acoustic guitar, banjo

Background vocalists
Trenna Barnes
Wyatt Beard
Lisa Cochran
Melodie Crittenden
Everett Murphy Drake
Duane Hamilton
Melonie Cannon
Jon Mark Ivey
Marabeth Jordon
Liana Manis
Shane McDonnell
Louis Dean Nunley
Lisa Silver
Kira Lynn Small
Cindy Richardson-Walker
D. Bergen White

Chart performance

Album

Singles

References

2006 albums
BNA Records albums
Jamey Johnson albums
Albums produced by Buddy Cannon